The 2012 World Football Challenge was the third World Football Challenge event, a series of friendly soccer matches played in the United States and Canada in July and August. The series opened on July 18. The opening match was between the Seattle Sounders FC of Major League Soccer (MLS) and Chelsea of the English Premier League, which Chelsea won 4–2. Real Madrid, who had won the equivalent tournament the previous year, were the only team to win all their matches in normal play.

Participants
The following eleven clubs took part in the 2012 World Football Challenge.

Venues
Eight venues were selected for the 2012 World Football Challenge.

Matches
All times are in the EDT time zone (UTC-4) (Local Times in parentheses).

Summary of results

Top goalscorers

References

External links
 

2012
2012–13 in English football
2012–13 in Spanish football
2012–13 in Scottish football
2012–13 in French football
2012–13 in Mexican football
2012–13 in Italian football
2012 Major League Soccer season
2012
2012